George Morgan (7 July 1844 – 17 July 1896) was an Australian cricketer. He played one first-class match for New South Wales in 1874/75.

See also
 List of New South Wales representative cricketers

References

External links
 

1844 births
1896 deaths
Australian cricketers
New South Wales cricketers
People from Bathurst, New South Wales
Cricketers from New South Wales